= Seratura =

Noble family of the Republic of Ragusa

Coat of arms of the House of Seratura

The Seraturi or Serratura (in Italian, meaning "lock"; Croatian: Seratura, Seraturi) were a noble family of the Republic of Ragusa.

== Sources ==
- Annales Ragusini Anonymi item Nicolai de Ragnina. Digessit Speratus Nodilo. Ex Officina Societatis Typographicae. 1883. "Seraturi (Serratura)"
